Luis Enrique Mejía López (born September 28, 1962) is a Nicaraguan singer-songwriter. He is known as  "El Príncipe de la Salsa" (The Prince of Salsa). He achieved widespread success with the  single "Yo No Sé Mañana".

Early life and education
He attended La Serna High School in Whittier, California.

Career
He started his career in the late 1980s and achieved success in the 1990s. He was one of the leading pioneers that led to the salsa romántica movement in the 1980s. Enrique has received two Grammy Award-nomination for "Best Tropical Latin Performance" for album Luces del Alma and his song "Amiga". He performed and recorded with salsa romántica group Sensation 85, which also included La Palabra and Nestor Torres. On May 19, 2009, his album Ciclos was nominated for numerous Latin Grammy Awards, his biggest breakthrough in over a decade. The album won the Grammy Award for Best Tropical Latin Album and also contained the hit single "Yo No Sé Mañana".

Luis Enrique hosted the first season of Objetivo Fama. He won two Latin Grammys and the Grammy for Best Tropical Latin Album in 2010.

Personal life
He mentioned in an interview with Billboard that his top five favorite salsa singers are Ruben Blades, Celia Cruz, Johnny Pacheco, Louie Ramirez, and Oscar D'Leon.

Awards and nominations

"Yo No Sé Mañana" received a Latin Grammy Award for "Best Tropical Song" and a nomination for Song of the Year. The song was nominated at the 2010 Lo Nuestro Awards  for Tropical Song of the Year. The song was awarded a Billboard Latin Music award for "Tropical Airplay – Song of the Year".

The Lo Nuestro Awards are awarded annually by American network Univision. Luis Enrique received one award in 1989.

|-
|rowspan="4" scope="row"| 1989
|scope="row"| Himself
|scope="row"| Tropical/Salsa New Artist of the Year
| 
|-
|scope="row"| Himself
|scope="row"| Tropical/Salsa Male Artist of the Year
| 
|-
|scope="row"| Amor y Alegría
|scope="row"| Tropical/Salsa Album of the Year
| 
|-
|scope="row"| "Tu No Le Amas, Le Temes"
|scope="row"| Tropical/Salsa Song of the Year
| 
|-
|rowspan="3" scope="row"| 1990
|scope="row"| Himself
|scope="row"| Tropical/Salsa Male Artist of the Year
| 
|-
|scope="row"| Mi Mundo
|scope="row"| Tropical/Salsa Album of the Year
| 
|-
|scope="row"| "Lo Que Pasó Entre Tu y Yo... Pasó"
|scope="row"| Tropical/Salsa Song of the Year
| 
|-

Discography
Studio albums

Amor de Media Noche (1987)
Amor y Alegria (1988)
Mi Mundo (1989)
Luces del Alma (1990)
Una historia diferente (1991)
Dilema (1993)
Luis Enrique (1994)
Genesis (1996)
Timbalaye (1999)
Evolución (2000)
Transparente (2002)
Dentro Y Fuera (2007)
Ciclos (2009)
Soy y Seré (2011)
Jukebox: Primera Edicion (2014)

References

1962 births
Living people
Salsa musicians
Grammy Award winners
Latin Grammy Award winners
20th-century Nicaraguan male singers
Sony Discos artists
Top Stop Music artists
21st-century Nicaraguan male singers
Latin music songwriters